The 2008 United States House of Representatives elections in South Carolina were held on Tuesday, November 4, 2008.  The primary elections were held on June 10 and the runoff elections were held two weeks later on June 24. The composition of the state delegation before the election was four Republicans and two Democrats.

All seats were considered safe for their incumbent parties except for districts 1 and 2. This was the last time that Democrats won more than one congressional district from South Carolina until 2018.

Overview

District 1

Incumbent Republican Congressman Henry E. Brown, Jr. defeated Democratic candidate Linda Ketner by a surprisingly thin margin to win a fifth term in Congress. Ketner's performance was the strongest performance by a Democrat that Brown had seen in his career and was made all the more surprising by the fact that she was openly lesbian and the 1st district, stretching across the coast of South Carolina, was strongly conservative.

District 2

Incumbent Republican Congressman Joe Wilson defeated Democrat and Iraq War Veteran Rob Miller by the thinnest margin of his electoral career. Miller's performance in this conservative district rooted in eastern and southern South Carolina was surprising, though ultimately was not strong enough to unseat Wilson in his bid for a fifth term.

District 3

Though two of his fellow Republican Congressman faced tougher-than-expected bids for re-election, incumbent Republican Congressman J. Gresham Barrett easily dispatched Democratic nominee Jane Ballard Dyer, a pilot, in this staunchly conservative district based in western South Carolina.

District 4

Incumbent Republican Congressman easily defeated Democratic candidate Paul Corden and Green Party candidate C. Faye Walters in this very conservative district rooted in Upstate South Carolina.

District 5

Long-serving incumbent Democratic Congressman John Spratt has been able to maintain popularity in this conservative district based in northern South Carolina, enabling to repeatedly win re-election despite the national mood. This year proved no different, with Spratt easily winning a fourteenth term over Republican challenger Albert Spencer and Constitution Party candidate Frank Waggoner.

District 6

Incumbent Democratic Congressman Jim Clyburn, the House Majority Whip, easily won a ninth term in this very liberal, African-American majority district in central South Carolina. Clyburn won re-election over Republican Nancy Harrelson by the largest margin out of anyone in the South Carolina congressional delegation.

See also
United States House elections, 2008
United States Senate election in South Carolina, 2008

References

External links
South Carolina State Election Commission

U.S. Congress candidates for South Carolina at Project Vote Smart
Campaign contributions for South Carolina congressional races from OpenSecrets
South Carolina U.S. House of Representatives race from 2008 Race Tracker

2008
South Carolina
United States House of Representatives